Žukov may refer to:
 Dolní Žukov, a village, now part of the town of Český Těšín, Czech Republic
 Horní Žukov, a village, now part of the town of Český Těšín, Czech Republic

See also
 Zukhov (disambiguation)